Navai Kola (also Romanized as Navā’ī Kolā) is a village in Karipey Rural District, Lalehabad District, Babol County, Mazandaran Province, Iran. At the 2006 census, its population was 746, in 178 families.

References 

Populated places in Babol County